Polyvision is a company that manufactures CeramicSteel surfaces for applications such as whiteboards, chalkboards, architectural surfaces and panels, and infrastructure projects. Headquartered in Georgia, Polyvision was acquired by Industrial Opportunity Partners in February 2020. The company was founded in 1954 under the name Information Display Technology, Inc. and began operating under the name Polyvision in May 1995. Polyvision has production facilities in Okmulgee, Oklahoma, New Philadelphia, Ohio, and Genk, Belgium, with their Okmulgee facility being one of the area's major employers.

Mergers and acquisitions

In 1998, Polyvision purchased Alliance International Group, a manufacturer of CeramicSteel products used in visual displays and writing surfaces, for about $75 million.

Polyvision acquired Nelson Adams in May 1999.

In January 2000, Polyvision purchased both American Chalkboard and Peninsular Slate.

Polyvision became a subsidiary of Steelcase in August 2001. In 2012, it was announced that Polyvision’s educational technology products would become part of the Steelcase Education Solutions group.

Polyvision was divested by Steelcase and acquired by Industrial Opportunities Partners in February 2020.

Polyvision announced its acquisition of Marsh Industries in August of 2020.

Projects

Polyvision has created surfaces for many public art installations, only a few of which include:

 The "Flat Earth" mural at the Dijkzigt Metro Station in Rotterdam, artwork by Peter Jansen
 Artwork at Telok Ayer MRT station in Singapore, art by Lim Shing Ee and Kazunori Takeishi 
 Dublin's Last Supper by John Byrne in 2003

Awards and Recognition

Some of PolyVision's products have won awards at the NeoCon World's Trade Fair:

Other awards
2005 MAX Award winner for the Walk-and-Talk Interactive Panel and Cordless Lectern
2010 Best in Tech by Scholastic

Polyvision's Genk facility was the first European CeramicSteel manufacturer to earn a Cradle-to-Cradle certification for its environmentally sustainable practices.

References

Manufacturing companies based in Georgia (U.S. state)
Manufacturing companies of the United States
Industrial supply companies